Felicity Landon is an English freelance journalist specialising in global maritime, industry and logistics. She is based near Stowmarket, in Suffolk. Landon works as a feature writer, reporter, columnist and editor. She has worked in the maritime sector for more than 25 years.

Early life
Landon grew up in Essex, where she attended New Hall School, near Chelmsford. She went on to study journalism at Harlow College.

Career
Landon worked for the East Anglian Daily Times before becoming a freelance journalist. She has worked in the maritime sector since 1990. She has written for publications such as Port Strategy, Seatrade Maritime, Shipping Network, Heavy Lift & Project Forwarding International, Lloyd's List and Industry Europe. Landon has also written company history books, including a commemorative book to celebrate the centenary of Dunlop Aircraft Tyres, a history of e2v and a history of the international law firm Stephenson Harwood.

Awards
Landon has won a number of awards from The Seahorse Club:
 Runner-up, Journalist of the Year 2018
 Innovation Journalist of the Year 2017
 Runner-up, Journalism on Innovation Award 2016
 Runner-up, Supply Chain Journalist of the Year 2016
 Supply Chain Journalist of the Year 2012
 Runner-up, Journalist of the Year 2009

References

Living people
English journalists
English magazine editors
People educated at New Hall School
Alumni of Harlow College
Year of birth missing (living people)